Qaleh Koti (also Romanized as Qal‘eh Kotī; also known as Qalā Kotī) is a village in Mianrud Rural District, Chamestan District, Nur County, Mazandaran Province, Iran. At the 2006 census, its population was 242, in 61 families.

References 

Populated places in Nur County